Louis de Dieu (7 April 1590, Flushing – 23 December 1642, Leiden) was a Dutch Protestant minister and a leading orientalist.

His grandfather had served at the court of Charles V, and his father, Daniel de Dieu, was also a protestant minister and linguist.  Louis was educated at Leiden, where he was regent of the Walloon College (1637-42). He declined the chair of theology and oriental languages at Utrecht.

Works
Compendium Grammaticae Hebraicae et dictionnariolum praecipuarum radicum (Leiden, 1626)
Apocalypsis S. Joannis syriace, ex manuscripto exemplari bibliothecae Josephi Scaligeri deprompta, edita caractere syriaco et hebraeo, cum versione latina, graeco textu et notis (Leiden, 1627)
Grammatica trilinguis, Hebraica, Syriaca, et Chaldaica (Leiden, 1628)
Rudimenta linguae persicae (Leiden, 1639); a Persian grammar
Grammatica Linguarum Orientalium, ex recensione Dav. Clodii (Frankfurt, 1683); four grammarshebraic, syriac, chaldaic and persian.

Critica sacra, sive animadversiones in loca quaedam difficiliora Veteris et Novi Testam (Amsterdam, 1693); commentary on the Old Testament and the New Testament
Aphorismi theologici (Utrecht, 1693)

Traite contre l'Avarice (Deventer, 1695)

References

Bibliography

External links
Works of Lodewijk de Dieu
Biography - University of Leiden
Biography at http://www.iranica.com

1590 births
1642 deaths
17th-century Dutch Calvinist and Reformed ministers

Dutch orientalists

Linguists from the Netherlands
People from Vlissingen
People from Leiden